The European Systemic Risk Board (ESRB) is a group established on 16 December 2010 in response to the ongoing financial crisis. It is tasked with the macro-prudential oversight of the financial system within the European Union in order to contribute to the prevention or mitigation of systemic risks to financial stability in the EU. It shall contribute to the smooth functioning of the internal market and thereby ensure a sustainable contribution of the financial sector to economic growth.

The ESRB is a macro-prudential oversight body of the EU and it is part of the European System of Financial Supervision (ESFS), the purpose of which is to ensure the supervision of the EU's financial system. As a body lacking juridical personality, the ESRB relies on hosting and support by the European Central Bank. It includes representatives from the ECB, national central banks and supervisory authorities of EU member states, and the European Commission.

Overview 
The operation of the board has been entrusted to the European Central Bank and the first Chair of the ESRB was Jean-Claude Trichet. Currently the ESRB is chaired by Christine Lagarde, the ECB president. In order to take advantage of existing and compatible structures, and to minimise any delay to the commencement of its operations, the ECB provides analytical, statistical, administrative and logistical support to the ESRB, and technical advice is also drawn from national central banks, supervisors and an independent scientific committee.

Ieke van den Burg Prize for research on systemic risk 
The ESRB's Advisory Scientific Committee awards the annual Ieke van den Burg Prize for outstanding research conducted by young academics on a topic related to the ESRB's mission. The prize is named in honor of Ieke van den Burg, for her work on financial stability. The winning paper is usually presented at the ESRB Annual Conference and published in the ESRB Working Paper Series.

See also
 European Banking Authority
 European Insurance and Occupational Pensions Authority
 European Securities and Markets Authority
 List of acronyms: European sovereign-debt crisis

References

External links
 Regulation (EU) No 1092/2010 of the European Parliament and of the Council of 24/11/2010 on European Union macro-prudential oversight of the financial system and establishing a European Systemic Risk Board (the ‘ESRB Regulation’)
 Council Regulation (EU) No 1096/2010 of 17/11/2010 conferring specific tasks upon the European Central Bank concerning the functioning of the European Systemic Risk Board
 Larosière report
 Rules of procedure of the ESRB
 Code of conduct of the ESRB

2010 in the European Union
Systemic risk
Financial risk
European Union financial market policy
Financial regulatory authorities
Government agencies established in 2010
Organisations based in Frankfurt
2010 establishments in Germany

sv:Europeiska systemet för finansiell tillsyn#Europeiska systemrisknämnden